The Avon Descent is an annual, two-day, white water event along the Avon and Swan Rivers in Western Australia. It includes both paddle craft (kayaks, surf skis) and small motor boats, and runs from Northam to the Perth suburb of Bayswater. It is held in August of every year. The first Avon Descent was held in 1973. The event was filmed by the second year.  The descents are regularly photographed at each years event. 

Sponsors and commercial support regularly changes, sometimes annually. Past sponsors include Coates Hire and Multiplex.

While it was still operating on main line track, the Hotham Valley Railway had special trains on the Avon Valley part of the Eastern railway to coincide with the race.

Course 
It is the only event in the world where both power craft and paddle craft race compete.

There also have been guides to canoeing the river - in general terms as to how to negotiate the river.
The region map of the Avon valley first published in 1987 included a section relating to the event.

Change and check points 

The course has check points, teams changeover points, and powercraft fuel stops.

Check locations
      Northam          - Day 1 start location
1 Katrine Bridge
2 Duidgee Park
3 Wetherall Reserve
4 Cobbler Pool         - Day 1 finish location, Day 2 start location
5 Emu Falls
6 Stronghills Farm
7 Bells Rapid
8 Upper Swan bridge
9 Middle Swan Bridge
 Riverside Gardens, Bayswater -   Day 2 finish location

Rapids 

Named rapids identified in the outline map.

 Glen Avon rapid
 Toodyay rapid
 Leatherhead rapid
 Moondyne rapid
 Lookout rapids
 Championship rapid
 Syds rapid
 Walyunga rapid
 Bells rapid

Prizes 
There has been an increase in the prize pool from 2007 of $10,000 providing an extra $6,000 for 1st, $3,000 for 2nd and $1,000 for 3rd fastest single paddle craft. In 2006 757 competitors started the event in 459 craft.

Classes 
The top class in the powerboats is the 10hp sports class. These boats are made from foam and fibreglass, and have hydraulic jacks that enable the motor to be jacked up. The motors are unmodified and run a surface piercing propeller. These powerboats can reach speeds of approximately 70km/h.

References

Further reading
(1993) Avon descent - Colin Arcus talks about winning the first race in 1957 - Subiaco post, 20 July 1993

External links

Whitewater sports
Sports competitions in Western Australia
Darling Range
Avon River (Western Australia)
1973 establishments in Australia